The 1951 Mississippi Southern Southerners football team was an American football team that represented Mississippi Southern College (now known as the University of Southern Mississippi) as a member of the Gulf States Conference during the 1951 college football season. In their third year under head coach Thad Vann, the team compiled a 6–5 record.

Schedule

References

Mississippi Southern
Southern Miss Golden Eagles football seasons
Mississippi Southern Southerners football